Choi Seung-hyun (born November 4, 1987), better known by his stage name T.O.P, is a South Korean rapper, songwriter and actor. He is a member of the South Korean K-Pop group Big Bang. He made his solo debut in 2010 with the release of the digital single "Turn It Up." Later that year, T.O.P and bandmate G-Dragon formed a subunit to release the album GD & TOP (2010). His second single, "Doom Dada" was released in 2013.

Albums

Collaboration albums

Single albums

Singles

As a lead artist

As featured artist

Other charted songs

Production credits

Music videos

See also
 Big Bang discography
 GD & TOP discography

Notes

References

Discography
Discographies of South Korean artists